The Bournemouth West by-election was held on 18 February 1954.  It was held due to the resignation of the incumbent Conservative MP, Robert Gascoyne-Cecil.  It was won by the Conservative candidate, John Eden.  When Eden was elected  he was the youngest member of the House of Commons of the United Kingdom, known as Baby of the House.

References

1954 elections in the United Kingdom
1954 in England
By-elections to the Parliament of the United Kingdom in Hampshire constituencies
By-elections to the Parliament of the United Kingdom in Dorset constituencies
Politics of Bournemouth